Galatasaray SK Wheelchair Basketball 2011–2012 season is the 2011–2012 basketball season for Turkish professional basketball club Galatasaray SK.

The club competes in:
IWBF Champions Cup
Kitakyushu Champions Cup
Turkish Wheelchair Basketball Super League

Current roster

Squad changes for the 2011–2012 season

In:

Out:

Results, schedules and standings

Preseason games

Kitakyushu Champions Cup 2011
Galatasaray won the Kitakyushu Champions Cup.

FINAL

Turkish Wheelchair Basketball Super League 2011–12

Regular season
1st Half

IWBF Champions Cup

References

Galatasaray S.K. (wheelchair basketball) seasons
2011–12 in Turkish basketball by club
2011 in wheelchair basketball
2012 in wheelchair basketball
Galatasaray Sports Club 2011–12 season